Bric Gettina is a 1025 metres high mountain in the Ligurian Prealps (part of the Ligurian Alps) in Italy.

Geography 
The mountain is located in the province of Savona, in Liguria. In the SOIUSA (International Standardized Mountain Subdivision of the Alps) it gives the name to the Costiera del Bric Gettina, a long ridge which, starting from the main chain of the Alps at monte Settepani, heads south-east towards the Ligurian Sea, dividing the valleys Pora and Maremola.

History 

On the slopes of Bric Gettina looking towards Pora Valley during the Renaissance period some silver mines have been exploited. On the site are now visible some tunnels and the remains of buildings devoted to first processing of the mineral and sheltering of miners.

Access to the summit 
The summit of Bric Gettina can be accessed following unmarked tracks departing from the foothpath connecting Casa del Mago and the former silver mines.

References

External links 

  Ipotesi di ricerca sulle Miniere di galena argentifera del Bric Gettina (in Comune di Rialto, presso Finale Ligure), on-line article of Alfredo Pirondini e Gian Paolo Bocca.

Gettina
Mountains of Liguria
Mountains of the Ligurian Alps
Archaeological sites in Liguria
Province of Savona